Sylvie Lepeltier (born 14 May 1962) is a French slalom canoeist who competed from the late 1970s to the mid-1990s. She won four medals in the K1 team event at the ICF Canoe Slalom World Championships with three golds (1983, 1985, 1993) and a silver (1987).

World Cup individual podiums

References

French female canoeists
Living people
Medalists at the ICF Canoe Slalom World Championships
1962 births